Nob was a priestly town in ancient Israel in the vicinity of Jerusalem. The town is mostly known as the site of a massacre described in the Bible where the town's Hebrew priests are massacred by Doeg the Edomite who acted on orders from King Saul.

Location
The town is situated in the southern portion of the land associated with the Tribe of Benjamin, and is identified within the village of Shuafat, to the north of Jerusalem.

The site is largely identified by historical geographers as Bayt Nuba. It likely belonged to the Tribe of Benjamin, Jerusalem being at the border between the tribes of Benjamin and Judah.

In the Bible
The town is known for its mention in the Book of Samuel (chapters 21-22) as the site of a massacre of Hebrew priests. The general reading of the incident follows that David visits Nob while being pursued by Saul. David deceives the high priest Ahimelech, who replies in innocence to Saul interrogation. Saul then orders Doeg the Edomite to execute the priests of Nob. One interpretation follows that David was seeking the support of the ecclesiastical establishment as the nation's only counter-authority to the state. This reading of the text follows that since Nob was a city of priests, it would be an unlikely place for David to seek food and weapons in his flight from Saul. Priests may not be expected to have arms, and the food which locals might bring to them as offerings are ritually permitted to priests and their families only (designated as terumah). For this reason, some commentaries note that David partakes the showbread which actually is more sacred than the priestly food, but is not consecrated in the same status of terumah. Others interpret the story of David's arrival to Nob as an intentional act to eat the sacred showbread and to retrieve Goliath’s sword which was kept in Nob. These acts are performed to downplay the prestige of Saul. An alternate reading suggests that Ahimelech knowingly colluded with David.

Aside from the incident in the Book of Samual, the town of Nob is mentioned in the Bible in connection with the Assyrian attack of Israel described in the Book of Isaiah (10:32), and in relation to the Jewish settlements after the Babylonian Exile listed in the Book of Nehemiah (11:33).

See also
Shiloh (biblical city)

References

Former populated places in Southwest Asia
Hebrew Bible cities
Levitical cities
Massacres in the Bible
Books of Samuel